The New Century Club is located at 253 Genesee Street in Utica, New York. It was added to the National Register of Historic Places in September, 1985.  It is architecturally significant for its Greek Revival architecture, once characteristic of this part of the city of Utica.  It is socially significant as the home of the New Century Club, a women's civic organization established in 1893 and "responsible throughout the early twentieth century for projects that notably improved Utica's educational system, outdoor recreational facilities and youth justice system."

It was a work of Utica architect Frederick H. Gouge.

See also
 New Century Club (Wilmington, Delaware)
 National Register of Historic Places listings in Oneida County, New York

References

Women's clubs in the United States
Clubhouses on the National Register of Historic Places in New York (state)
History of women in New York (state)
National Register of Historic Places in Oneida County, New York